Evagrius (died c. 380) was the archbishop of Constantinople for a brief period in 370, and possibly in 380.

In 370, the Arians elected Demophilus to fill the bishopric vacancy after the death of Eudoxius of Antioch. The Nicene Christians and the deposed bishop of Antioch Eustathius chose Evagrius for that see; but a few months later he was banished by the emperor Valens, and remained in exile until his death.

Some sources claim that he was elected a second time in 379 or 380, after the expulsion of Demophilus by emperor Theodosius I.

References 

380 deaths
4th-century Archbishops of Constantinople
Opponents of Arianism
4th-century Romans
Year of birth unknown